Erdal Merdan (April 8, 1949 – March 24, 2010) was a German dramatist, actor and stage director of Turkish origin.

Born in Kayseri he lived and worked in Germany since 1969. In the Academy Award for Best Foreign Language Film-winning movie Journey of Hope (1990) he also had an international appearance as a movie actor.

Works

Theater 
 Aladdin and the tired lamp (1986), children's play along with Gretel Merdan
 Leyla, Leyla (1986), piece for youth and adults along with Gretel Merdan
 Ayschegül and black ass (1991), children's play

Radio play 
 The Feast of Sacrifice (1982), radio play
 Friends (1983), along with radio play Gretel Scherzinger

Book contribution 
 Birgit Kirchhöfer (ed.): Children's Theatre Workshop in 1991 , with scenic texts and discussion contributions from Lilly Axster, Silvio Huonder, Katrin Lange, Erdal Merdan, Henning Fangauf, Wolfgang Schneider, Manuel Schöbel ; Literary Colloquium Berlin 1992

Filmography (selection) 
 1975: Tatort: Death in the subway tunnel (TV), directed by Wolf Gremm
 1978: The Rose and the Nightingale (TV), directed by Frank Guthke
 1979: Alamanya, Alamanya - Germania, Germania (documentary), directed by Hans A. Guttner
 1983: In the middle of nowhere (documentary), directed by Hans A. Guttner
 1984: Fire for the Big Dragon (TV), directed by Eberhard Itzenplitz
 1990: Journey of Hope, directed by Xavier Koller
 1991: Tatort: The Chinese Method (TV), directed by Maria Knilli
 1994: Polizeiruf 110: Ghosts (TV), directed by Klaus Emmerich
 1995: On foot and without money (TV miniseries), directed by Werner Masten
 1998: The pirate, directed by Bernd Schadewald
 1998: The key (short film), directed by Su Turhan
 2003: A number / Karen (experimental film), directed by Stefan Mehlhorn
 2005: Photosynthesis (Short Film), directed by Jens Leske
 2006: Cypress, directed by Johannes Bauer, Monika Lödl among others
 2006: Kopfsache (short film), directed by Doron Wisotzky
 2009: Charity (short film), directed by Stephanie Olthoff

Awards 
 Shot in the English edition of personal encyclopaedia Who's Who 1978
 Grant from the Literary Colloquium Berlin 1991
 AZ -star 1997 as an ensemble member for transit home / Set tables - a trip with Gorky's Summer Guests (Fish & plastic)
 tz -Rose as an ensemble member for transit home / Set tables - a trip with Gorky's Summer Guests (Fish & plastic)

Literature 
 Otto J. Groeg: Who's who in the Arts: A Biographical Encyclopedia Containing Some 13,000 Biographies and Addresses of Prominent Personalities, Organizations, Associations and Institutions Connected with the Arts in the Federal Republic of Germany , Who's Who Book & Publ., 1978

References

 Otto J. Groeg: Who's who in the Arts: A Biographical Encyclopedia Containing Some 13,000 Biographies and Addresses of Prominent Personalities, Organizations, Associations and Institutions Connected with the Arts in the Federal Republic of Germany, Who's Who-Book & Publ., 1978

External links
 

Turkish emigrants to West Germany
German male stage actors
German directors
1949 births
2010 deaths
German male writers
People from Kayseri